Björn Bach (born 21 June 1976) is a German sprint canoer who competed from 1997 to 2006. Competing in two Summer Olympics, he won two silver medals in the K-4 1000 m (2000, 2004).

Born in Magdeburg he took up the sport at the age of thirteen.

Bach won a dozen medals at the ICF Canoe Sprint World Championships with six golds (K-4 500 m: 1998, 1999; K-4 1000 m: 1997, 1998, 2001, 2005), four silvers (K-4 200 m: 2005, K-4 500 m: 1997, K-4 1000 m: 1999, 2002), and two bronzes (K-4 200 m: 1997, K-4 1000 m: 2003).

His most recent success came at the 2006 European Championships, held in Račice, Czech Republic, where he won a K-4 1000 m bronze medal. At the 2006 ICF Flatwater Racing World Championships however, he finished outside the medals with a fourth in the K-4 1000 m, sixth in the K-4 500 m, and fifth in the K-4 200 m, thus putting to an end Bach's record of having won medals at seven consecutive world championships.

At club level he competes for his home-town club, SC Magdeburg and is trained by Guido Behling.

Height: 1.95 m (6' 5")
Weight: 92 kg (14 st 7) (203 lb)

References

 German Canoeing Union

External links
 
 

1976 births
Canoeists at the 2000 Summer Olympics
Canoeists at the 2004 Summer Olympics
German male canoeists
Living people
Olympic canoeists of Germany
Olympic silver medalists for Germany
Olympic medalists in canoeing
ICF Canoe Sprint World Championships medalists in kayak
Medalists at the 2004 Summer Olympics
Medalists at the 2000 Summer Olympics
Sportspeople from Magdeburg